The White Albun is the sixth studio album by Australian alternative rock band TISM, released on 24 June 2004. The title is a reference to and deliberate misspelling of The White Album, an unofficial name for the album The Beatles. Ron Hitler-Barassi told the age why the title was chosen "What we're doing here is basically what Jet are doing, which is taking The Beatles ideas and changing them a little bit at the end. If it's worked for Jet, it's going to work for us, that's what we're hoping."

The album was released as part of a larger package containing two DVDs. The first DVD is titled A Film By Antonionioni which is a live concert called Save Our TISM. The second DVD is TISM: A Docunentary (keeping with the 'n' theme) which features interviews of the band, a history of TISM and rare or previously-unreleased footage from TISM concerts.

The album was re-released on 10 November 2004 in a standard DVD case. On 17 September 2021, it was reissued on CD and double vinyl, with the CD including the "Save Our TISM" concert, albeit without the telethon interludes between songs, and the LP containing a bonus 7" EP, including four songs from the concert.

Reception

Track listings

The White Albun

A Docunentary

 Recorded at Hi Fi Bar on 26 September 2003.

A Docunentary

Charts

Release history

References

2004 albums
TISM albums
TISM video albums
2004 video albums
2004 live albums
Live video albums
Rockumentaries